The Garver-Rentschler Barn is a registered historic building in Hamilton, Ohio, United States.  It was listed on the National Register on 11 August 1980 under the name of "Garver Barn"; the official designation was changed to the present name in 2014.

Historic uses 
Agricultural Outbuildings

Notes 

Barns on the National Register of Historic Places in Ohio
National Register of Historic Places in Butler County, Ohio
Barns in Ohio